The Symphony No. 7 by Gustav Mahler was written in 1904–05, with repeated revisions to the scoring. It is sometimes referred to by the title Song of the Night, which Mahler never knew. Although the symphony is often described as being in the key of E minor, its tonal scheme is more complicated. The symphony's first movement moves from B minor (introduction) to E minor, and the work ends with a rondo finale in C major. Thus, as Dika Newlin has pointed out, "in this symphony Mahler returns to the ideal of 'progressive tonality' which he had abandoned in the Sixth". The complexity of the work's tonal scheme was analysed in terms of "interlocking structures" by Graham George.

Background
In 1904, Mahler was enjoying great international success as a conductor, but he was also, at last, beginning to enjoy international success as a composer. His second daughter was born that June, and during his customary summer break away from Vienna in his lakeside retreat at Maiernigg in the Carinthian mountains, he finished his Symphony No. 6 and sketched the second and fourth movements (the two Nachtmusik movements) for Symphony No. 7 while mapping out much of the rest of the work. He then worked on the Seventh intensively the following summer, claiming to take just four weeks to complete the first, third and fifth movements.

The completed score was dated 15 August 1905, and the orchestration was finished in 1906; he laid the Seventh aside to make small changes to the orchestration of Symphony No. 6, while rehearsing for its premiere in May 1906. The Seventh had its premiere on 19 September 1908, in Prague with the Czech Philharmonic, at the festival marking the Diamond Jubilee of Emperor Franz Joseph.

The three years which elapsed between the completion of the score and the symphony's premiere witnessed dramatic changes in Mahler's life and career. In March 1907 he had resigned his conductorship of the Vienna State Opera, as the musical community in Vienna turned against him (which was why he chose Prague for the work's debut); on 12 July his first daughter died of scarlet fever; and, even as she lay on her deathbed, Mahler learned that he was suffering from an incurable heart condition. Musicologists surmise that this is why the optimism and cheerfulness of the symphony was subsequently tempered by the small but significant revisions Mahler made in the years leading up to its premiere.

Instrumentation
The symphony is scored for large orchestra. As in some of his other symphonies (particularly his 5th and 6th), Mahler's use of unconventional instruments is displayed in the 7th with the scoring of tenorhorn, cowbells, guitar and mandolin. The orchestra consists of the following:

Woodwinds
piccolo

3 oboes
cor anglais
E clarinet
3 B and A clarinets
bass clarinet
3 bassoons
contrabassoon

Brass

4 horns
3 trumpets
3 trombones
tuba

Percussion
4 timpani
bass drum

cymbals
triangle

tam-tam

glockenspiel

Strings

2 harps

1st violins
2nd violins
violas
cellos
double basses

Structure
The duration of the symphony is around 80 minutes. There is, however, an exceptionally lengthy recording by Otto Klemperer, which is 100 minutes long.
Another recording by Hermann Scherchen with the Toronto Symphony Orchestra is 68 minutes long.

The work is in five movements:

I. Langsam – Allegro risoluto, ma non troppo 

(E minor, beginning B minor)

The movement is in sonata form.

The accompaniment rhythm

was said to have come to Mahler whilst rowing on the lake at Maiernigg after a period of compositional drought. The principal theme, presented by horns in unison in E minor, is accompanied similarly, though much faster and in a higher register.

The second theme is then presented by violins, accompanied by sweeping cello arpeggios.

This theme is infected with chromatic sequences. At one point the violins reach an F7 (the highest F on a piano). The exposition is wrapped up with a march theme from the introduction, which is followed by a repeat of the principal theme.

This leads straight into the development, which continues for some time before suddenly being interrupted by pianissimo trumpet fanfares and a slow chorale based on the march theme from the introduction.

This section has been interpreted as a "religious vision". It has also been asserted that this section contains the chains of fourths that impressed Arnold Schoenberg. After this section plays itself out, a harp glissando propels the music into a new section based on the second theme and the march/chorale theme. But before a climax can be articulated, the final cadence is interrupted by the music from the introduction and the baritone horn arioso. This leads into the recapitulation, but before the actual recapitulation occurs, there is an incredibly difficult high note for trumpet. In fact, the principal trumpet for the work's premiere even confronted Mahler, saying "I'd just like to know what's beautiful about blowing away at a trumpet stopped up to high C." Mahler had no answer, but later pointed out to Alma that the man did not understand the agony of his own existence.

The recapitulation is very similar to the exposition, although it is significantly more agitated. There is a grand pause during the first thematic section that leads into a massive climax. The second theme is also considerably shortened. The march theme from the introduction leads straight into an epic coda that features march rhythms and multiple high points in the orchestral texture, before ending on an E major chord.

The lengthy and dramatically intense first movement is followed by three distinct pictures of night: two movements entitled "Nachtmusik" (i.e. nocturne) and a "shadowy" scherzo in between them.

II. Nachtmusik I

Allegro moderato. Molto moderato (Andante) C major – C minor

The first of the two Nachtmusik movements is said to represent a Nachtwanderung ("walk by night"). Mahler, who described the movement in vague terms, compared it to Rembrandt's painting The Night Watch, though he did not intend to evoke the painting itself. Overall, the movement possesses a grotesque quality, but always with friendly intentions. The movement progresses through a series of marches and dances and naturalistic nocturnal descriptions. One remarkable aspect of the movement is its symmetrical form; it is a rondo following the structure (I)–(A)–(B)–(I/A)–(C)–(I/A)–(B)–(A)–(I), where (I) is an introductory section and (I/A) combines the introductory music and the (A) theme.

The second movement opens with horns calling to each other.

The second horn is muted, however, to create the illusion of distance. Scampering woodwinds imitating somewhat grotesque bird calls pass off into the distance, as the trumpets sound the major/minor seal from Symphony No. 6. The horns introduce a rich, somewhat bucolic (A) theme, surrounded by dancing strings and a march rhythm from his song "Revelge".

This theme leads to some confusion about the key, as it switches between C major and C minor every few beats. The rural mood is heightened by a gentle, rustic dance for the (B) section – typical of Mahler at his most carefree and childlike – as well as by the gentle clanking of distant cowbells in the returns of the introductory section. The malicious (C) theme, upon its return, is arabesqued by the "Revelge" rhythms and bird calls from earlier in the movement.

III. Scherzo 

Schattenhaft. Fließend aber nicht zu schnell ("Shadowy. Flowing but not too fast") D major

There is an undercurrent of night about the spooky third movement; while "scherzo" means "joke", this movement is remarkably spooky and even grim. If the first Nachtmusik possessed a friendly mood disguised in grotesqueries, this movement is a demon sneering at the listener. Nonetheless, as the Spanish musicologist José L. Pérez de Arteaga points out, this movement is really "a most morbid and sarcastic mockery of the Viennese waltz".

The movement begins with a strange gesture: a pianissimo dialogue between timpani and pizzicato basses and cellos with sardonic interjections from the winds. After some buildup, the orchestra sets off on a threatening waltz, complete with unearthly woodwind shrieks and ghostly shimmerings from the basses, with a recurring "lamenting" theme in the woodwinds. The scherzo is contrasted by a warmer trio in the major mode, introduced by and containing a "shrieking" motif beginning in the oboes and descending through the orchestra.

The brilliance of this movement lies in its extraordinary and original orchestration, which gives this movement a strongly nightmarish quality. Multiple viola solos rise above the texture, and there is a persistent timpani and pizzicato motif that pervades the dance. The theme and its accompaniment are both passed around the orchestra rather than being played by a specific instrument. At one memorable point in the score, the cellos and double basses are instructed to play pizzicato with the volume , with the footnote, "pluck so hard that the strings hit the wood".

IV. Nachtmusik II
Andante amoroso. F major

The fourth movement (the second Nachtmusik) contrasts with the first in that it illustrates a more intimate and human scene. With its amoroso marking and reduced instrumentation (trombones, tuba and trumpets are silent and the woodwinds are reduced by half) this movement has been described as "a long stretch of chamber music set amidst this huge orchestral work". A solo violin introduces the movement,

while a horn solo above the gentle tones of a guitar and mandolin create a magical serenade character.

However, sardonic dissonances give this movement a more satirical and even diseased feel. The trio contrasts with this, and more reflects the intimate mood that would be expected from a Viennese serenade. The movement ends in transcendence, providing a peaceful backdrop for the finale's abrupt entrance.

V. Rondo Finale

Boisterous timpani joined by blazing brass set the scene for the riotous final movement in C major.

The long, arduous first movement, after three shorter movements developmental in mood, is finally equalled by a substantial "daylight" finale. The movement is a rondo combined with a set of eight variations, capped off by a dramatic coda. There are parodies of Wagner's Die Meistersinger von Nürnberg and Franz Lehár's The Merry Widow. There are many strange and abrupt interruptions of climactic buildups, including at the very end of the coda. The texture is, for the most part, based on a banal descending broken scale motif.

There is also a heavy emphasis on acerbic brass chorales and relentlessly satirical rustic dances. Little wonder that, of all the symphony's movements, this has come in for the greatest amount of criticism and puzzlement. It has been seen by many as something of a let-down and somewhat superficial, dodging questions set by the previous movements; its virtually unrelenting mood of celebration seems quite at odds with the dark character of the earlier movements. "A vigorous life-asserting pageant of Mahlerian blatancy", is how Michael Kennedy describes it, and Mahler himself explained it with the aperçu "The world is mine!" The principal theme of the first movement crops up amidst the outrageously exuberant finale, but is soon quelled and reappears in the major mode. Cowbells from the first Nachtmusik and the unpitched low bells from Mahler's Symphony No. 6 also make appearances. The movement (and therefore the symphony) ends in a very strange way; a seemingly random stray G changes the harmonic quality from major to augmented, the music suddenly drops to piano before a stubborn  C major chord ends the work.

Critical analysis
The harmonic and stylistic structure of the piece may be viewed as a depiction of the journey from dusk till dawn. The piece evolves from uncertain and hesitant beginnings to an unequivocal C major finale, with its echoes of Wagner's Die Meistersinger von Nürnberg: indeed, at the premiere the overture to this opera was performed after the symphony.

This journey from night to day proceeds via an extraordinary third movement scherzo, marked schattenhaft (shadowy), which may have been what prompted Arnold Schoenberg to become a particular champion of the work. The abundance of themes based upon the interval of a fourth has parallels with the First Chamber Symphony.

The piece has several motifs in common with the Symphony No. 6, notably the juxtaposition of major with minor chords, the march figure of the first movement, and the use of cowbells within certain pastoral episodes.

Reception
Mahler conducted the premiere of his Symphony No. 7 in Prague in 1908. A few weeks later he conducted it in Munich and the Netherlands. Both the audience and the performers at the premiere were confused by the work, and it was not well received.

Premieres
 World premiere: 19 September 1908, Prague, with the Czech Philharmonic Orchestra conducted by the composer.
 Dutch premiere: 2 October 1909, The Hague, with the Concertgebouw Orchestra conducted by the composer.
 British premiere: 18 January 1913, London, conducted by Henry Wood.
 American premiere: 15 April 1921, Chicago, conducted by Frederick Stock.

Recordings

 Claudio Abbado recorded the symphony three times – first with the Chicago Symphony Orchestra in the studio in 1984, and then live with the Berlin Philharmonic in 2002. There is also a DVD recording with the Lucerne Festival Orchestra.
 Vladimir Ashkenazy with the Sydney Symphony Orchestra, 2011
 Daniel Barenboim with the Staatskapelle Berlin
 Leonard Bernstein with the New York Philharmonic in 1965. He recorded it two other times – with the New York Philharmonic in 1986, and with the Vienna Philharmonic in 1974 (a video was also recorded with the Vienna Philharmonic).
 Gary Bertini with Kölner Rundfunk-Sinfonie-Orchester
 Pierre Boulez with the Cleveland Orchestra
 Riccardo Chailly with the Royal Concertgebouw Orchestra
 Andreas Delfs with the Milwaukee Symphony Orchestra
 Gustavo Dudamel with the Orquesta Sinfónica Simón Bolívar in 2014
 Iván Fischer with the Budapest Festival Orchestra in 2019
 Valery Gergiev with the London Symphony Orchestra
 Michael Gielen recorded a Mahler cycle during the 1990s
 Bernard Haitink recorded it twice, with the Concertgebouw Orchestra and the Berlin Philharmonic
 Michael Halász with the Polish National Radio Symphony Orchestra
 Jascha Horenstein with the New Philharmonia Orchestra
 Eliahu Inbal has recorded this symphony three times – first with the Frankfurt Radio Symphony Orchestra in 1986 (Denon Blu-spec cd COCO-73087), then with the Czech Philharmonic in 2011 (Exton SACD EXCL-00077) and finally with the Tokyo Metropolitan Symphony Orchestra in 2013. (Exton SACD OVCL-00517 & OVXL-00084 "One point microphone version")
 Mariss Jansons with the Oslo Philharmonic, the Bavarian Radio Symphony Orchestra and a live recording with the Royal Concertgebouw Orchestra
 Neeme Järvi with The Hague Philharmonic
 Otto Klemperer with the New Philharmonia Orchestra, recorded in 1968
 Kirill Kondrashin with the Leningrad Philharmonic Orchestra in 1975. There is also a live recording from 1979 with the Concertgebouw Orchestra.
 Rafael Kubelík recorded it twice. The first was with the Bavarian Radio Symphony Orchestra in 1970 as part of his complete cycle with the Bavarian Radio Symphony Orchestra. The second was a live recording in 1976.
 Yoel Levi with the Atlanta Symphony Orchestra
 James Levine with the Chicago Symphony Orchestra
 Lorin Maazel with the Vienna Philharmonic, New York Philharmonic and Philharmonia Orchestra
 Kurt Masur with the Leipzig Gewandhaus Orchestra
 Václav Neumann recorded it twice, first in 1968 with the Leipzig Gewandhaus Orchestra, and in 1977–78 as part of a complete symphony cycle with the Czech Philharmonic.
 Seiji Ozawa with the Boston Symphony Orchestra
 Simon Rattle with the City of Birmingham Symphony Orchestra
 Hans Rosbaud with the Berlin Radio Symphony Orchestra, 1952
 Hermann Scherchen with the Vienna Symphony, and another recording with the Toronto Symphony Orchestra
 Giuseppe Sinopoli with the Philharmonia Orchestra, recorded in 1992.
 Sir Georg Solti with the Chicago Symphony Orchestra, 1971
 Klaus Tennstedt with the London Philharmonic Orchestra
 Michael Tilson Thomas with the San Francisco Symphony. Winner of two Grammy Awards for Best Orchestral Performance and Best Classical Album. (Michael Tilson Thomas also recorded this symphony with the London Symphony Orchestra in 1999.)
 Osmo Vänskä with the Minnesota Orchestra
 Edo de Waart with the Netherlands Radio Philharmonic
 Hans Zender with the Rundfunk-Sinfonieorchester Saarbrücken
 David Zinman with the Tonhalle-Orchester Zürich
 Kirill Petrenko with the Bavarian State Orchestra in 2021.

Other appearances
The opening horn theme of the second movement was used in an advertisement for Castrol GTX oil in the early 1980s. Derivatively of the Castrol ad, the same theme appeared in a British commercial for Alpecin men's shampoo in 2016.

References

Further reading
Agawu, Kofi (1996). "The narrative impulse in the second Nachtmusik from Mahler's Seventh Symphony." In Craig Ayrey and Mark Everist, eds., Analytical Strategies and Musical Interpretation: Essays on Nineteenth- and Twentieth-Century Music. (Cambridge University Press), pp. 226-241. 
Hefling, Stephen E. (2007). "'Ihm in die Lieder zu blicken': Mahler's Seventh Symphony sketchbook." In Stephen E. Hefling, ed., Mahler Studies (Cambridge University Press), pp. 169-216. 
Mitchell, Donald (April 1, 1963). "Mahler's Enigmatic Seventh Symphony". The Listener, vol. 49, no. 1776, p. 649. 
Scherzinger, Martin (March 1995). "The Finale of Mahler's Seventh Symphony: A Deconstructive Reading." Music Analysis, vol. 14, no. 1, pp. 69–88.
Whettam, Graham (December 30, 1965). "Mahler's seventh symphony." The Listener, p. 1088. 
Williamson, John R. (1982). "Deceptive cadences in the last movement of Mahler's 'Seventh Symphony'." Soundings, no. 9, pp. 87–96.
Williamson, John R. (March 1986). "The Structural Premises of Mahler's Introductions: Prolegomena to an Analysis of the First Movement of the Seventh Symphony." Music Analysis, vol. 5, no. 1, pp. 29–57.
Zychowicz, James L. (December 2004). "Mahler's Seventh Symphony Revisited." Naturlaut, vol. 3, no. 3, pp. 2–6.

External links
 

Symphony No. 07 (Mahler)
1906 compositions